Christophe Pratiffi is a classical guitar player born in France. He has played since the age of 5. Passionate about the guitar, he began his musical studies under the supervision of James Szura at the Conservatoire National of the Metz Region (France). He finished his studies in 1998 and was unanimously awarded the Gold Medal by the jury, the first prize of excellence, and the Superior Inter-regional Prize awarded by Gérard Abiton and Olivier Bensa from Montbéliard, France.

He made his first appearance on the national scene when he was just 17 years old. He has performed as a soloist at the prestigious Théâtre de Montebéliard, the Arsenal de Metz, and the Poirel auditorium of Nancy. He has also performed internationally at the Auditorium (Eutherpe) of León (Spain), the Palais of Trèves (Germany), the Prévost Auditorium (Montreal, Canada) and Université Laval (Québec, Canada).

Pratiffi has always been interested in chamber music. He has collaborated with artists of international renown such as Gaspar Hoyos (flutist, Colombia) at the Guitar Festival of Nancy, Jaime Cordoba (Colombia) and Claude Gagnon (Québec). He has also interpreted the Guitar Concerto by Heitor Villa-Lobos and the Concierto de Aranjuez de Joaquín Rodrigo under the direction of conductors such as Fernand Quattrocchi (France) and Jacques Lacombe (Québec).

With the aim of bringing out the best of his art, his personal motto is "the search for beauty". This search led to his first memorable encounter with the Argentinian guitarist Roberto Aussel and the Uruguayan guitarist Alvaro Pierri.

Loving the diversity and the musical richness of all the musical compositions that have contributed to the evolution of the classical guitar, his repertoire includes a wide variety of music including baroque, the classic, romantic and contemporary styles.

Presently established in Quebec City, he currently performs as a soloist and in duo with the Quebec guitar player David Jacques. He teaches at Cegep de Ste-Foy (Québec) and at the summer season of the musical academy of the Vallée de la Vologne (Vosges, France) since 2003. He has also been a guitar instructor in various French institutions from 1997 to 2005.

Living people
Year of birth missing (living people)
French classical guitarists
French male guitarists